The Peugeot 308 is a small family car produced by French automaker Peugeot. It was unveiled in June 2007, and launched in September 2007. The 308 replaced the 307, and positioned below the 508 and above the smallest 208.

The 308 is followed by a coupé cabriolet (the 308 CC) for the 2009 model year, a station wagon (the 308 SW) in March 2008, and a sedan version (the 408) in China for the 2012 model year.

The first generation was largely based on its predecessor, the 307, and utilized modified versions of that car's drivetrain and chassis. The second-generation model was unveiled in 2013, and it was awarded as the 2014 European Car of the Year. The third-generation model was unveiled in 2021 and introduced a hybrid powertrain.



First generation (T7; 2007)

Design

Launched as the replacement for the Peugeot 307 in most international markets, the new vehicle was based upon the old 307's chassis, but has new bodywork and is slightly longer and wider. Developed under the project code "Project T7", ts coefficient of drag is 0.29, and it has a five-star rating on Euro NCAP. Following the facelift of March 2011, the drag factor was reduced to 0.28.

The 308 is manufactured in France at the Mulhouse and Sochaux factories. It is also manufactured in Kaluga, Russia, for the local market, since 2010, and El Palomar, Argentina, for the South American market since 2011. 

The car attracted minor criticism in right-hand drive markets as the windscreen wiper mechanism was unchanged from the design for left-hand drive vehicles, meaning a large unwiped area was present at the top of the windscreen on the driver's side, but was absent on the passenger side, as the driver's side wiper was shorter, and the passenger wiper "went up" first.

Body styles

Hatchback
The 308 was available as a five-door hatchback, with a three-door limited to a few markets.

Estate
A station wagon concept version of the 308, the Peugeot 308 SW Prologue, was also unveiled at the 2007 Frankfurt Motor Show. The production version was shown at the 78th International Geneva Motor Show in March 2008 and went on sale that summer. The 308 SW (or 308 Touring in Australia) was available in a five or seven-seat versions.

A further variation of the X08 chassis used by the 308 is an SUV or an MPV, named 3008.

Cabriolet
A cabriolet with a retractable hardtop known as the 308 CC replaced the Peugeot 307 CC in February 2009. With the roof up the boot space capacity is 465 litres but this reduces to 266 litres with the roof down.

Sedan
In September 2011, Peugeot presented, for the market in China, a four-door sedan version of the 308. This version produced for the market in China by Dongfeng is based on 308 facelift, but differs from the model in Europe, with large front grille, more chrome on the hips and different shape of the LED taillights. The interior is identical to the European model.

The engine range includes a petrol 1.6 16V 110 hp and 143 hp 2.0 16V. The trunk has a volume of 502 liters. The Peugeot 308 sedan, sold at 160.000 units in three years, joins the Peugeot 408 in China, a C segment car with a slightly higher price.

Facelift

A facelifted 308 was released in May 2011, following the public launch at the 2011 Geneva Motor Show, with a new front end and minor changes to the rear of the vehicle. Peugeot also launched the 308 e-HDI micro-hybrid model with stop-start technology, a system to recover energy during deceleration and a hybrid battery that delivers additional energy on startup.

A full hybrid 3008 was also announced at the same time. The version produced in South America is assembled with this facelift. The facelift was also given to the 308 SW and 308 CC.

Second facelift

As the EMP2 platform was not industrialized in South America, the first generation 308 continued to be marketed there and received a second facelift in 2015.
The front bumper is inspired by the 308 II (reduced front lights, Peugeot logo, and text, anti-fog lights, less contoured hood ...).

The interior undergoes some modifications to accommodate some elements of the 308 II. There is a touch screen perfectly integrated with the centre console, instead of the traditional CD / MP3 and empty pockets.

For some years, the 308 I was sold in Argentina alongside the European-built 308 II, locally named 308 S.

As it counterpart the first generation 408, the first generation 308 stayed manufactured in Argentina until 2021, when it was discontinued without any local or imported direct replacement.

Concepts

308 Hybrid
Bosch announced in June 2007 that it was supplying hybrid diesel-electric technology to Peugeot for the 308. A prototype 308 equipped with this technology was displayed in the Frankfurt Motor Show of 2007, and a further 'Prologue' concept car was shown at the 2008 Paris Motor Show, featuring a 1.6 litre HDi engine to turn the front wheels, and an electric motor to turn the rears.

308 RCZ Coupé

Peugeot presented a 2+2 coupé concept car development of the 308, the 308 RCZ, at the 2007 Frankfurt Motor Show. This coupé concept is 18 mm lower than the standard car. It has similar proportions to the Audi TT. The final production model was unveiled at the 2009 Frankfurt Motor Show as the RCZ without the 308 name, and went on sale in the spring of 2010.

Awards
In November 2007, the 308 was awarded the Goldene Lenkrad (Golden Steering Wheel) in Germany. A panel of automotive professionals chose the 308 as the best compact family car after it finished first in nine of the 15 criteria.

Second generation (T9; 2013)

The second generation 308 was unveiled on 13 May 2013, with updated style along with the 508 and the 208. Peugeot changed its numbering system where the final digit is fixed: 8 for the mainstream range, and 1 for the models aimed at emerging countries, such as the Peugeot 301. It is built on the PSA EMP2 platform, shared with Citroën C4 Picasso, resulting in  weight loss compared to previous generation.

The changes included daytime running lights/DRL at the bottom and the blinker (turn signal indicator) is on the daytime light, advising the pedestrian or other road user to which direction it is moving.

GTI by Peugeot Sport 
The 250 hp version had full LED headlights, an electronic limited slip differential, 18" alloys, keyless entry, stop/start technology, 11 mm lowered ride height, a coloured reversing camera and twin exhausts.

Additionally, the 270 hp version gets 380 mm Alcon front brakes, massaging leather/Alcantara bucket seats, a torsen limited-slip differential and 19" lightweight alloy wheels.

Awards 
In March 2014, the Peugeot 308 was awarded European Car of the Year, in competition with the BMW i3 and Tesla Model S. The Peugeot 308 was also voted Car of the Year by Auto Europa in Italy, by the Italian automotive journalists association, Car of the Year in Switzerland by Schweizer Illustrierte, and four other magazines.

2017 update 
The features include a new bonnet and front bumper design and indicators that scroll, and a newly designed grille that features the famous Peugeot Lion. All models, except Active and GTi, feature the Panoramic roof. New DRLs are matched at the back with the LED Claws lit permanently when the vehicle is running.

A new more powerful 1.5HDi engine with 130 bhp joined the line up from September 2017. All models have TomTom satellite navigation as standard in addition to the central touchscreen update.

2020 update 
In July 2020, a revised 308 was announced featuring a number of trim and colour changes, but most significantly, the introduction of the digital i-Cockpit which was first introduced on the Peugeot 3008.

Production of the 308 II ended in May 2021.

Gallery

Third generation (P5; 2021)

The third-generation 308 was unveiled on March 18, 2021, and launched in May 2021. It is also the first vehicle to bear the new Peugeot logo. It went to production on 29 September 2021 and went on sale on the same day.

All variants of the third-generation 308 is equipped with LED headlights complemented by vertical LED daytime running lights. These headlights feature the Peugeot Matrix LED Technology on GT and GT Premium variants. It is also equipped with the Drive Assist pack that adds adaptive cruise control with Stop and Go function, lane keeping assistance, semi-automatic lane change, anticipated speed recommendation, and curve speed adaptation. Other features offered as standard or optional include long-range blind-spot monitoring, 360-degree surround-view parking assistance with four cameras, heated for the windshield and steering wheel, and an E-call+ emergency call function.

It is also offered as a plug-in hybrid producing . The  version will also be available on the GT version.

The station wagon version was released in June 2021. A crossover derivative was unveiled in June 2022 as the 408.

A battery electric version called the e-308 was introduced in September 2022. It is equipped by a new generation 54 kWh battery pack, with a chemical composition of 80 percent nickel, 10 percent manganese and 10 percent cobalt.

Safety

Euro NCAP
The 308 in its standard European configuration received 4 stars from Euro NCAP in 2022.

Sales and production

Notes

References

External links

 Official website

308
Compact cars
Hatchbacks
Station wagons
Convertibles
Euro NCAP small family cars
Front-wheel-drive vehicles
Hardtop convertibles
Cars introduced in 2007
2010s cars
Touring cars